Izhbuldy (İşbuldı) is a rural locality (a village) in Kashkarovsky Selsoviet, Zilairsky District, Bashkortostan, Russia. The population was 77 as of 2010. There is 1 street.

Geography 
Izhbuldy is located 36 km northeast of Zilair (the district's administrative centre) by road. Kashkarovo is the nearest rural locality.

References 

Rural localities in Zilairsky District